David Jude Johnson  (born 16 October 1971) is an Indian former cricketer who was primarily a fast-medium bowler and a useful lower order batsman. He played in two Test matches in 1996, taking three wickets. He became the fastest bowler India have ever produced when he managed to clock 157.8 km/h to dismiss Michael Slater during Australia's tour of India in 1996. It is believed his tenure in international cricket were cut short due to his lack of control.

Career 

He made his Test debut against Australia in the one-off Test at the Ferozshah Kotla and then went on the tour of South Africa but got to play only in the first Test. Often considered as a wayward bowler not having good control, his international career came to an end quickly.

1971 births
Living people
Anglo-Indian people
India Test cricketers
Karnataka cricketers
South Zone cricketers
People from Hassan district
Cricketers from Karnataka

mr:डेव्हिड जॉन्सन
ta:டேவிட் ஜோன்சன்